is an underground metro station located in Mizuho-ku, Nagoya, Aichi Prefecture, Japan operated by the Nagoya Municipal Subway's Meijō Line. It is located 21.4 kilometers from the terminus of the Meijō Line at Kanayama Station.

History
Myōon-dōri Station was opened on 30 March 1974.

Lines

 (Station number: M24)

Layout
Myōon-dōri Station has two underground opposed side platforms.

Platforms

References

External links
 Myōon-dōri Station official web site 

Railway stations in Japan opened in 1974
Railway stations in Aichi Prefecture